It's All on U, Vol. 2 is the third studio album by American rapper B.G., released on November 11, 1997, on Cash Money Records. It's All on U, Vol. 1, is his previous album. All tracks from It's All on U, Vol. 2 were produced and contributed by Cash Money's in-house producer Mannie Fresh. The album debuted at #184 on the Billboard 200 chart, #14 on the Billboard Heatseekers Album Chart, and #20 on The Top R&B Albums Chart.

The album was re-released in 1999 when Cash Money signed a pressing and distribution deal with Universal Records in 1998.

Track listing
(co.) signifies a co-producer

References

B.G. (rapper) albums
1997 albums
Cash Money Records albums
Albums produced by Mannie Fresh
Sequel albums